Su Shun Lae (also spelt Su Shun Lai, Su Shoon Lae, Su Shune Lae; born 28 July 1981) is a Burmese film actress and advertising model. Her first advertisement was "Tabarwa Pa Nya Myay". The advertisement she is most popular for is " Lin Tit sar". Her first film is "Sa Hta Gan". She starred in one film, 25 videos and 54 advertisements until May 2004.

Su Shun Lae is married to Zayar Win and wedding reception at the Sedona Hotel in Yangon on June 5, 2014.

Filmography

Films
Sa Hta Gan

Video
Joe [Part II]
Lay Pyay Nan Tae Taching
Nay Min Yae Ei Daw Tha Wingabar
Hta Man Thi Yae Taman Kyar
Kaday Shit Sel Ta Thay Thar
Than Gaung Sut Min Thar Nae Set Kaw Ma Dar Tha Mar
Villain Hero
Kyun Taw Ka Lu Mike
Than Ta Yar Set Won Ta Nay Yar Yar [Part I]
Tway Yine Kya Mar Yine Bawa Yine
Mote Soe Htaung Chauk Taw Mhaut The Thar Kaung
A Hlwar
Lin No` Gang Nae Mhaw Win Dar Na Let
La Min A Linka A Nyeint
Lu Mike Ba Tode
Sar Palin Min Aung Shwe Moe Ngwe Moe Ywar Say Phyo [Part I]
Lu Kyan
Mi Chaung Theit
Sanda Pinle
Phoee Sar Phat

References

1981 births
Burmese film actresses
Living people
People from Yangon
21st-century Burmese actresses